Hit & Myth is the fifth studio album by New Zealand singer Jenny Morris, released in August 2002, by Yep! Records, seven years since the release of her last album, Salvation Jane. Yep! was a new independent record label established by Warren Fahey, who founded Larrikin Records.  The album was co-produced by Nick Wales (CODA), was released on 8 May 2002 by Yep! Records. The album features classical musicians (Renaissance Players, Winsome Evans), pop musicians (Davey Lane, Jodi Phillis (ex Clouds)) and jazz (PROP) musicians.

Morris wrote or co-wrote nine of the eleven songs on the album, the others, "Guiding Star", was written by Neil Finn and "The Blacksmith" is a traditional folk song. "The Blacksmith", according to the album liner notes, was the first song Morris learnt on the guitar and "an integral part of my writing influences ever since", whilst Morris attributes inspiration for the song "The Sculptor" to the 13th-century Islamic poet Jalaluddin Rumi.

The music video for "Downtime" featured a number of well-known Australian actors, including Hugo Weaving, Bryan Brown, Matt Newton and Peter Fenton, miming the words to the song.

Neither the album nor the singles "Home", released 29 October 2001, and "Downtime", released 15 July 2002, managed to chart.

Track listing
 "Downtime" (Jenny Morris, Nick Wales, S. Peach) - 4:21
 "Home" (Jenny Morris) - 4:15
 "Killer Man" (Jenny Morris, Andrew Farriss, T. Van Der Kuil) - 4:09
 "I Climb High" (Jenny Morris) - 4:39
 "Into the Water" (Jenny Morris, Tim Wedde) - 5:10
 "The Blacksmith" (Traditional) - 3:41
 "Its Happened Again" (Jenny Morris, Davey Lane) - 5;04
 "Dressing Gown" (Jenny Morris) - 4:04
 "Guiding Star" (Neil Finn) - 4:42
 "The Sculptor" (Jenny Morris, Nick Wales) - 4:26
 "Wailing Wall" (Jenny Morris) - 7:27

Personnel
 Winsome Evans —
 Lew Kiek —
 Davey Lane — guitar, vocals
 Jodi Phillis — guitar, vocals
 Nick Wales — viola
 Tim Wedde — keyboards

References

2002 albums
Jenny Morris (musician) albums